Francis Brennan is an Irish hotelier and television personality.

Personal life 
Brennan was raised in Balally Drive, just off Sandyford Road and close to Dundrum, Dublin. He went to Holy Cross National School, Dundrum, CBS Westland Row and Catholic University School (CUS) in Leeson Street where he was taught by the Marist Fathers. Brennan has never married or had children, and has described himself as being on the asexual spectrum.

Career

Hotelier 
Brennan is the owner of the five-star Park Hotel in Kenmare and the Dromquinna Manor Hotel in Templenoe, both in County Kerry. He runs the hotel with his brother John.

Television 
Brennan rose to fame in Ireland in 2008 after starring in RTÉ series At Your Service with his younger brother John, in which the Brennans provided advice to the owners of struggling businesses in the hospitality sector. Francis is known for his meticulous attention to detail. The brothers appeared together as guests on Tubridy Tonight in October 2008 and on The Saturday Night Show in January 2011.

Brennan has since made other television appearances separately from his brother. He appeared in Stars Go Racing in 2011. In 2011, he starred in his own TV show called Francis Brennan's Grand Tour, the premise of which saw Brennan flamboyantly escort 16 paying holidaymakers on a tour of the European continent. A further series of Francis Brennan's Grand Tour was broadcast in July and August 2016, this time taking 12 paying holidaymakers on a tour of India's Golden Triangle, followed by a third series in 2017 with a trip to Vietnam
Despite his high profile on television screens, he has admitted to never watching television himself. He is a devout Roman Catholic and has a set of rosary beads given to him by Pope John Paul II.

Writing 
During September 2022, Brennan announced the release of his book "The Homekeeper’s Diary 2023". The book, based on inspiring readers to remodel their homes, advice on cleaning, gardening, cooking, foraging and other aspects of household living.

References 

1955 births
Living people
Irish hoteliers
Irish television personalities
People from Kenmare
RTÉ television presenters
Hoteliers
People educated at Catholic University School